"Blue Collar Man (Long Nights)" is a song by American rock band Styx, released as the first single from their eighth studio album, Pieces of Eight (1978).  Released in 1978, the single came in two 7" vinyl formats: one with the b-side "Superstars" (a track from The Grand Illusion) and a second single with the instrumental album track "Aku-Aku" as the b-side.  Some printings of the single were also issued in a translucent blue vinyl, which are now highly sought after collectors items.

Lyrics and music
Tommy Shaw recalled that a friend of his was laid off from the railroad. "He was having to go stand in line at the unemployment office. It just drove him nuts, because he’s like, ‘I wanna work! I don’t wanna be standing around here, asking for a handout…’ It really bugged him, and that was the inspiration for that song.” As read in a Circus magazine (or the like) of the time, the music was composed by Shaw after hearing the sound of his motor boat engine when it failed to start. He said it sounded like a good riff to a song.  

The song is in D natural minor, with moments of D harmonic minor due to the use of the V chord, A major.

Reception
According to Billboard, it has "riveting high energy guitar licks and a powerful lead vocal." Cash Box said that "rhythm guitar work provides a gritty, rough and tumble bottom which highlights the bright lead guitar passages and the upper register vocals."  Record World praised the organ and guitar playing and said that "Styx has specialized in hard rockers with soaring harmony hooks and this single...is in the same groove."  Allmusic critic Mike DeGagne said that it best represents "Styx's feisty, straightforward brand of album rock," who called it "an invigorating keyboard and guitar rush -- hard and heavy, yet curved by Tommy Shaw's emphasized vocals."   Classic Rock critic Malcolm Dome rated it as Styx 5th greatest song, saying that it is "very [Bruce] Springsteen in philosophy, but very Styx in execution."

The song reached #21 in the United States in November 1978, and spent two weeks at No. 9 on the Canada RPM Top 100 Singles chart.

Chart performance

Weekly charts

Year-end charts

Personnel
 Tommy Shaw – lead vocals, lead guitar
 James Young – rhythm guitar, backing vocals
 Dennis DeYoung – keyboards, backing vocals 
 Chuck Panozzo – bass
 John Panozzo – drums

Music video
A promo video for this song was filmed by director Bruce Gowers of the band performing on a soundstage. Videos were also shot for the Pieces of Eight songs "Sing for the Day" and "I'm OK".

In popular culture
The song was used in the Season 8 episode of The Middle titled "Trip and Fall".  A re-recorded version of the song has been released as downloadable content for the Rock Band video game.

Sources

External links
 

Styx (band) songs
1978 singles
Music videos directed by Bruce Gowers
Songs written by Tommy Shaw
A&M Records singles
Songs about labor
1978 songs